Anophiodes is a genus of moths of the family Erebidae first described by George Hampson in 1913.

Species
Anophiodes concentratus Warren, 1914
Anophiodes indistinctus Prout, 1922
Anophiodes meeki (Bethune-Baker, 1908)
Anophiodes pulchrilinea Wileman & West, 1929

References

 
Ercheiini
Noctuoidea genera